Barbie: A Fashion Fairytale is a 2010 computer-animated adventure film directed by William Lau and produced by Mattel Entertainment (under the name of Barbie Entertainment) with Rainmaker Entertainment. It was first released to DVD on September 14, 2010, and later made its television premiere on Nickelodeon on November 21, 2010. The eighteenth entry in the Barbie film series, it features the voice of Diana Kaarina as Barbie, replacing Kelly Sheridan for the first time. It revolves around Barbie who travels to Paris and discovers her Aunt Millicent closing her fashion house. But Barbie and aunt's assistant Alice try to save the business with the help of three magical creatures.

Plot summary
While filming an adaptation of The Princess and the Pea, Barbie questions the director's bizarre creative choices which results in her being fired. Immediately afterwards, Barbie is lambasted on social media and receives a phone call from Ken who breaks up with her. Heartbroken and to get away from her troubles, Barbie goes on vacation to Paris to visit her aunt Millicent, an esteemed fashion designer. Meanwhile, Barbie's friends, Teresa and Grace, go to confront Ken where it's revealed that the breakup was really a recording by Barbie's rival Raquelle, which she made while he was reading a script. Ken decides to rush to Paris to amend the situation with Barbie.

In Paris, Barbie learns from rival fashion designer, Jacqueline, that Millicent is going out of business. Barbie meets Millicent and her assistant Alice and is informed that her aunt has lost work due to negative reviews and has since sold the building to a restaurant franchise known as "Hotdogeteria".

Alice takes Barbie to the attic and tells her about the magical creatures who supposedly lived in the fashion house. Placing one of Alice's original designs in a magic wardrobe, Barbie and Alice find and recite the chant to summon the magical creatures, who introduce themselves as the "Flairies", Shine, Shimmer, and Glimmer. Impressed by Alice's design, the Flairies use their magic to enhance it with sparkles. As the fashion house is the source of the Flairies' power, Barbie and Alice decide to put on a fashion show featuring new designs by Alice to raise money and save the building.

Jacqueline soon finds out about the Flairies and kidnaps them and demands they add sparkle to her own designs. Finding the outfits uninspiring, the Flairies warn Jacqueline that their magic might be unstable. Jacqueline ignores them and plans to put on her own fashion show the same night as Millicent's.

Despite the Flairies' disappearance, Millicent is inspired by Alice's designs and helps work on the line for the fashion show. Later that night, Barbie's poodle, Sequin, and Millicent's dog and cat, Jacques and Jilliana, are alerted to the Flairies' location by a trail of sparkles. The three pets sneak into Jacqueline's and rescue them. The next day, Barbie, Alice, and Millicent awaken to find sparkle added to all their new outfits, and an elaborate setup for the fashion show.

That night, Jacqueline presents her fashion show, however, the Flairies' magic backfires and the outfits start to rot on the runway. Repulsed, the audience leaves and flocks to Millicent's across the street. Barbie models the new designs in a spectacular fashion show. In a finale, Glimmer uses her magic to transform Barbie's gown, revealing her own talent as a designer. Soon after, Ken arrives, having faced numerous detours on his journey, and reaffirms his love for Barbie and kisses her, with the Flairies transforming his clothes into a new suit. An audience member places a large order for pieces from the line, and the payment is enough for Millicent to buy back the building from the Hotdogeteria owner.

A remorseful Jacqueline, who watched the fashion show, apologizes for her actions, which Millicent accepts and even agrees to work with her sometime. Liliana Roxelle, Paris's top fashion critic, congratulates them on an impressive show and invites them to a party. As they leave, Barbie is approached by a studio representative who invites her to work on a new film as a director.

Characters
Barbie is a sixteen-year-old teenager star with fantastic style. Barbie is optimistic, cheerful, friendly and a loyal and good friend. She goes to Paris to visit her favorite aunt after she is fired from the movie industry, and it is there she meets and befriends Marie-Alecia.
Ken is a seventeen-year-old male with an interest in sports and Barbie's boyfriend. Ken goes on a journey to Paris to prove that he loves her after finding out she went there and he had been tricked. In the end, the two became a couple once again like before.
Marie-Alecia "Alice" is a shy, aspiring sixteen-year-old fashion designer with some talent. Her dream is to succeed in the world of fashion, but she is too modest and unsure of herself to make any daring moves. But thanks to Barbie, she gains confidence in her abilities and herself.
Aunt Millicent is Barbie's aunt. Millicent is the owner of her own fashion house in Paris. She is fun, strong-willed and kind. Her formal rival is Jacqueline. She is the sister of Margaret Roberts (mother of Barbie).
Teresa is Barbie's sixteen-year-old friend with a unique perspective and point of view. She is very playful and even believes in aliens and the Sasquatch.
Grace is a sixteen-year-old friend of Barbie. She is very practical and mature and likes to give advice.
Raquelle is Barbie's sixteen-year-old rival. She always tries to make Barbie's life miserable, once even ripped her dress a lot. She calls Barbie and plays a recording of Ken's voice to make Barbie think he broke up with her, inspiring her to journey to Paris and meet her aunt out of misery.
Jacqueline is easy to spot with her hip and savvy personality and is on the cutting edge of fashion. As Millicent's sneaky and competitive rival designer, she doesn't want to be trendy; she wants to start the trends herself and will do anything to get ahead. But eventually, she is reformed and blends in like Millicent, and apologizes for her behavior.
Delphine is Jacqueline's sixteen-year-old loyal assistant and number-one fan. She usually goes along with her boss's sly schemes, but deep down she is a good person with a good heart, and would rather play fair. She likes the flairies and animals, too.
The Flairies – Shim'r, Glim'r and Shyn'e are a trio of stylish Flairies, creatures with sparkle-based powers and no wings. They add sparkles to any outfit that inspires them to improve them.

Shyn'e (pink) is the sassy, fearless leader. She adds a beautiful shine effect to fashions. Despite her dainty size, she isn't afraid to stand up for herself. She also makes sure the other flairies stay in line. She has a great sense of humor that makes her a blast to be with.

Shim'r (purple) is the light-hearted, happy-go-lucky dreamer who always expects positive things. Her magical flair is adding shimmer to fashions. She is usually found in the background smiling, but she is the only flairy with no sizable role.

Glim'r (coral) once had trouble using her sparkle-magic powers, as her magic often popped before it hit the clothing item. However, in the end, her powers turn out to be transforming things, which is the main course of events for the character. She is made into a designer of the Flairies.

Sequin is Barbie's French poodle. Just like her owner, Sequin loves to wear anything with bling, despite being fussy. She is also very playful and likes to have fun. When she first arrived in the fashion house, she made a mess in Jilliana and Jacques' room.
Jacques is a suave Jack Russell Terrier with a great talent for design. When he meets Sequin, he falls in love with her.
Jilliana is a snooty, pampered cat. She cannot help rolling her eyes at Jacques' not-so-inconsiderable crush on Sequin. Although Jilliana is happy that Sequin inspires Jacques to design again after his hiatus, she dislikes all the romance and fluff.

Cast

Songs
"Life is a Fairytale" – Tiffany Giardina 
"Another Me" – Lindsay Sorenson
"Get Your Sparkle On" – Rachel Bearer 
"Une Bonne Journee" – Simon Wilcox
"Rock the Runway" – Bradly Bacon
"It's a Perfect Day" – Adrian Petriw

References

External links

2010 direct-to-video films
Films about fashion
American direct-to-video films
Canadian direct-to-video films
2010s English-language films
2010s American animated films
2010 computer-animated films
Fashion Fairytale
Canadian animated feature films
Canadian independent films
American computer-animated films
Films about fairies and sprites
Films set in 2010
Films set in Paris
Universal Pictures direct-to-video animated films
Universal Pictures direct-to-video films
2010 films
Films directed by William Lau
Films about actors
2010s Canadian films